Franziska Becker (born 10 July 1949) is a German cartoonist.

Biography
Franziska Becker was born in Mannheim in 1949. After she had passed her school leaving examination there, she completed an auxiliary training as a medical technical assistant. Between 1972 and 1976 she studied at the Academy of Fine Arts in Karlsruhe. Among others she was taught by Markus Lüpertz.

In 1973 she became involved in the feminist movement in Heidelberg where she also met Alice Schwarzer. Her first cartoon appeared in the first issue of the magazine EMMA. Since then Becker's cartoons, caricatures and illustrations have appeared in numerous other magazines and journals. She also published twenty books.

In 1988 Becker was awarded the Max and Moritz Prize for best comic artist. In 2010, a solo exhibition dedicated to her was shown at the Caricatura Museum Frankfurt, comprising around 300 objects. In 2019 she was awarded the Hedwig Dohm certificate, which was criticised for her portrayal of women wearing headscarves.

Awards
 1988: Max & Moritz Prize
 2012: Göttinger Elch
 2013: Wilhelm Busch Prize
 2019: Hedwig-Dohm-Urkunde

References

German cartoonists
German feminists
German editorial cartoonists
German women cartoonists
German women illustrators
German caricaturists
German comics artists
German female comics artists
Artists from Mannheim
1949 births
Living people